Antonin Décarie (born 2 December 1982) is a Canadian former professional boxer. He was signed to Eye of the Tiger Management and trained by Marc Ramsay. He went 31-2 as a professional.

Amateur career 

Décarie started boxing at age 14, following the example of his step-father before him. He then proceeded to numerous national and international fights over the years. Décarie boxed in the 2002 Commonwealth Games, 2003 Pan American Games and he was lightweight Canadian champion in 2001, 2002 and 2004.

Professional career 

Décarie turned professional in 2005. He won the NABF welterweight title in 2012, following a technical knockout over Alex Perez. The fight was broadcast on Boxing After Dark from HBO. However, he lost his next fight by unanimous decision to Luis Carlos Abregu. The confrontation, which took place at José Amalfitani Stadium in Buenos Aires, was for the vacant WBC Silver welterweight title.

Professional boxing record

|-
| style="text-align:center;" colspan="8"|31 wins (10 knockouts), 2 losses, 0 draws, 0 no contests
|-  style="text-align:center; background:#e3e3e3;"
|  style="border-style:none none solid solid; "|Res.
|  style="border-style:none none solid solid; "|Record
|  style="border-style:none none solid solid; "|Opponent
|  style="border-style:none none solid solid; "|Type
|  style="border-style:none none solid solid; "|Round
|  style="border-style:none none solid solid; "|Date
|  style="border-style:none none solid solid; "|Location
|  style="border-style:none none solid solid; "|Notes
|- style="text-align:center;"
|Win  
|31-2
|align=left| Ivan Pereyra
|TKO 
|5 (10)
|2014-09-27
|align=left| Bell Centre, Montreal
|align=left|
|- style="text-align:center;"
|Win  
|30-2 
|align=left| Pablo Munguia
|UD|| 10 ||2014-03-28
|align=left| Lac Leamy Casino, Gatineau, Quebec
|align=left|
|- style="text-align:center;"
|Win 
|29-2 
|align=left| César Chávez
|TKO || 2 (8) ||2014-02-05
|align=left| New City Gas, Montréal, Quebec
|align=left|
|- style="text-align:center;"
|Win
|28-2
|align=left| Salim Larbi
|UD|| 6 ||2013-09-28
|align=left| Bell Centre, Montréal, Quebec	
|align="left"|
|- style="text-align:center;"
|Loss
|27-2
|align=left| Luis Carlos Abregu 
|UD || 10 ||2013-04-27
|align=left| José Amalfitani Stadium, Buenos Aires, Buenos Aires Province	
|align="left"|For vacant WBC Silver welterweight title
|- style="text-align:center;"
|Win
|27-1
|align=left| Alex Perez
|TKO|| 6 (10) ||2012-09-29
|align=left| MGM Grand at Foxwoods Resort, Mashantucket, Connecticut	
|align="left"|Won vacant WBC-NABF welterweight title
|- style="text-align:center;"
|Win 
|26-1 
|align=left| Victor Lupo Puiu
|UD|| 12 ||2011-12-17
|align=left| Colisée Pepsi, Quebec City, Quebec
|align=left|Won vacant WBC International welterweight title
|- style="text-align:center;"
|Win 
|25-1 
|align=left| Shamone Alvarez
|UD|| 10 ||2011-02-11
|align=left| Bell Centre, Montréal, Quebec	
|align=left|
|- style="text-align:center;"
|Win 
|24-1 
|align=left| Irving Garcia
|MD|| 10 ||2010-10-29
|align=left| Bell Centre, Montréal, Quebec	
|align=left|
|- style="text-align:center;"
|Loss 
|23-1 
|align=left| Souleymane M'baye 
|UD|| 12 ||2010-05-28
|align=left| Palais des Sport Marcel Cerdan, Levallois-Perret, Hauts-de-Seine	
|align=left|For vacant interim WBA welterweight title
|- style="text-align:center;"
|Win  
|23-0 
|align=left| Terrance Cauthen 
|TKO|| 10 (10) ||2009-10-03
|align=left| Montreal Casino, Montréal, Quebec		
|align=left|
|- style="text-align:center;"
|Win  
|22-0 
|align=left| Victor Hugo Castro 
|UD|| 12 ||2009-06-06
|align=left| Montreal Casino, Montréal, Quebec		
|align=left|Retained WBO NABO welterweight title
|- style="text-align:center;"
|Win  
|21-0 
|align=left| Dorin Spivey 
|UD|| 12 ||2009-01-30
|align=left| Bell Centre, Montréal, Quebec		
|align=left|Retained WBO NABO welterweight title
|- style="text-align:center;"
|Win  
|20-0 
|align=left| Hector Munoz 
|TKO|| 12 (12) ||2008-10-04
|align=left| Montreal Casino, Montréal, Quebec		
|align=left|Retained WBO NABO welterweight title
|- style="text-align:center;"
|Win  
|19-0 
|align=left| Brian Camechis  
|UD|| 12 ||2008-05-03
|align=left| Montreal Casino, Montréal, Quebec		
|align=left|Won vacant WBO NABO welterweight title
|- style="text-align:center;"
|Win  
|18-0 
|align=left| Israel Cardona  
|UD|| 10 ||2008-02-09
|align=left| Montreal Casino, Montréal, Quebec		
|align=left|
|- style="text-align:center;"
|Win  
|17-0 
|align=left| Andres Pablo Villafane  
|UD|| 8 ||2007-12-01
|align=left| Montreal Casino, Montréal, Quebec		
|align=left|
|- style="text-align:center;"
|Win  
|16-0 
|align=left| Frankie Zepeda
|UD|| 8 ||2007-11-10
|align=left| Montreal Casino, Montréal, Quebec		
|align=left|
|- style="text-align:center;"
|Win  
|15-0 
|align=left| Aaron Drake
|UD|| 6 ||2007-06-08
|align=left| Uniprix Stadium, Montréal, Quebec		
|align=left|
|- style="text-align:center;"
|Win  
|14-0 
|align=left| Ivan Orlando Bustos
|DQ|| 2 (10) ||2007-04-14
|align=left| Montreal Casino, Montréal, Quebec		
|align=left|
|- style="text-align:center;"
|Win  
|13-0 
|align=left| José Leónardo Corona
|UD|| 8 ||2007-01-26
|align=left| Bell Centre, Montréal, Quebec		
|align=left|
|- style="text-align:center;"
|Win  
|12-0 
|align=left| Leonardo Rojas
|UD|| 10 ||2006-11-03
|align=left| Marcel Dionne Arena, Drummondville, Quebec		
|align=left|Won vacant Canada light welterweight title
|- style="text-align:center;"
|Win  
|11-0 
|align=left| Jose Luis Alvarez
|TKO|| 2 (6) ||2006-09-15
|align=left| Bell Centre, Montréal, Quebec			
|align=left|
|- style="text-align:center;"
|Win  
|10-0 
|align=left| Ulises Jimenez
|MD|| 6 ||2006-06-02
|align=left| Melançon Arena, Saint-Jérôme, Quebec			
|align=left|
|- style="text-align:center;"
|Win  
|9-0 
|align=left| Jose Manjarrez
|UD|| 6 ||2006-05-16
|align=left| Bell Centre, Montréal, Quebec			
|align=left|
|- style="text-align:center;"
|Win  
|8-0 
|align=left| Ronny Glover
|TKO|| 1 (4) ||2006-04-21
|align=left| Augusta-Richmond County Civic Center, Augusta, Georgia			
|align=left|
|- style="text-align:center;"
|Win  
|7-0 
|align=left| Ulises Duarte
|RTD|| 4 (6) ||2006-03-24
|align=left| Bell Centre, Montréal, Quebec				
|align=left|
|- style="text-align:center;"
|Win  
|6-0 
|align=left| Bakary Sako
|UD|| 8 ||2006-03-03
|align=left| Salle Antoine-Labelle, Laval, Quebec				
|align=left|
|- style="text-align:center;"
|Win  
|5-0 
|align=left| Amadou Diallo
|UD|| 6 ||2005-12-02
|align=left| Bell Centre, Montréal, Quebec				
|align=left|
|- style="text-align:center;"
|Win  
|4-0 
|align=left| Ulises Cervantes
|TKO|| 1 (4) ||2005-09-16
|align=left| Bell Centre, Montréal, Quebec				
|align=left|
|- style="text-align:center;"
|Win  
|3-0 
|align=left| Stephane Savage 
|UD|| 4 ||2005-06-03
|align=left| Maurice Richard Arena, Montréal, Quebec				
|align=left|
|- style="text-align:center;"
|Win  
|2-0 
|align=left| Michael Springer 
|UD|| 4 ||2005-03-18
|align=left| Bell Centre, Montréal, Quebec				
|align=left|
|- style="text-align:center;"
|Win  
|1-0 
|align=left| Deon Sweeting
|TKO|| 1 (4) ||2005-02-19
|align=left| Pavillon de la Jeunesse, Quebec City, Quebec				
|align=left|

References

Antonin Décarie expéditif:The Guardian

External links

1982 births
Living people
Sportspeople from Laval, Quebec
Welterweight boxers
Canadian male boxers
Boxers at the 2002 Commonwealth Games
Commonwealth Games competitors for Canada
Boxers at the 2003 Pan American Games
Pan American Games competitors for Canada